Pinus herrerae, Herrera's pine, is a species of conifer in the family Pinaceae.
It is found only in Mexico. It is a straight trunked tree, 30–35 m tall and 75–100 cm dbh (diameter at breast height).

Bark: thick, reddish-brown or gray -brown. Twigs: In light gray with bases decurrent long cord. Needles: Green Color, in fascicles of 3, 10 to 20 cm in length; and 0.7 to 0.9 mm thin and lax wide. Cones: Solitary or in pairs 2-4x2-3.5 cm when open, dropping the year they mature. Scales: 50–80, opening soon, apófisis slightly raised with small umbo and mucronate. Seeds: 2.5-4x2-3 mm with wing 5-8x35 mm. Habitat: On the fringe of the cloud forest and pine and pine-oak growing beside Pseudotsuga .

References

herrerae
Least concern plants
Taxonomy articles created by Polbot
Flora of the Sierra Madre Occidental
Endemic flora of Mexico